Bootawatta South Grama Niladhari Division is a Grama Niladhari Division of the Pathahewaheta Divisional Secretariat of Kandy District of Central Province, Sri Lanka. It has Grama Niladhari Division Code 985.

Bootawatta South is a surrounded by the Godamunna West, Kapuliyadda West, Ankelipitiya, Bootawatta North, Doolmure, Narangasthenna and Nugaliyadda Pahala Grama Niladhari Divisions.

Demographics

Ethnicity 
The Bootawatta South Grama Niladhari Division has a Sinhalese majority (100.0%). In comparison, the Pathahewaheta Divisional Secretariat (which contains the Bootawatta South Grama Niladhari Division) has a Sinhalese majority (90.1%)

Religion 
The Bootawatta South Grama Niladhari Division has a Buddhist majority (99.8%). In comparison, the Pathahewaheta Divisional Secretariat (which contains the Bootawatta South Grama Niladhari Division) has a Buddhist majority (89.5%)

References 

Grama Niladhari Divisions of Pathahewaheta Divisional Secretariat